The United States Army Pathfinder School trains personnel in the U.S. Army and its sister services to set up parachute drop zones and helicopter landing zones for airborne and air assault missions.

The school's three-week course trains pathfinder candidates to navigate on foot; conduct sling load operations; establish and operate a helicopter landing zone; provide air traffic control (ATC) and navigational assistance to rotary-wing and fixed-wing aircraft; and establish and operate parachute drop zones (DZs), including computed air release system (CARP) DZs, ground marked release system (GMRS) DZs and Army verbally initiated release system (VIRS) DZs.  

All training and airborne operations are conducted in accordance with FM 3-21.220 (Static Line Parachuting Techniques and Training) and FM 3-21.38 (Pathfinder Operations).

In November 2020, a spokesman from the U.S. Army Training and Doctrine Command (TRADOC) said the Army would close the Pathfinder School to save money and help the Army shift to large-scale combat operations.  However, the Army National Guard Warrior Training Center Mobile Training Team at Fort Benning continue to offer Pathfinder classes for guard members.

Development of the modern U.S. Army pathfinder

Pathfinders make up less than .01% of the Army. Their primary mission is to set up parachute drop zones and helicopter landing zones for airborne and air assault missions.

The Pathfinders were created in World War II after early airborne operations found it too difficult to find drop zones at night and in bad weather, resulting in scattered drops up up to seven miles from the target. An idea from the British inspired the 509th Parachute Infantry Battalion and 504th Parachute Infantry Regiment, 82nd Airborne Division, to create an elite force to go in before the main assault with visual and electronic signaling devices to guide aircraft to the drop zone and gliders to their landing zones. Their first use in combat was 13 September 1943 during combat jumps into Italy.

WWII-era Pathfinders are most remembered for their jump into Normandy during the invasion of June 6, 1944, when they led Allied forces into Europe. They were employed throughout southern France, the Netherlands, Belgium, and Germany, in the course of Allied airborne operations until the end of the war in Europe. They were also used in the Pacific theater with the 11th Airborne Division during the liberation of the Philippines.

The Korean War saw limited use of the Pathfinders by the 187th Airborne Regimental Combat Team during two combat jumps and operations. The Vietnam War saw the largest use of Pathfinders due to the developments of helicopter insertion and resupply which were pioneered by the 11th Air Assault Division (Test). Nearly every Army aviation battalion had a Pathfinder detachment and deployed them on nearly every mission.

After the Vietnam War pathfinders were with the major Airborne units and various combat aviation battalions/groups. They also saw a growth in Army National Guard and Army Reserve Pathfinder platoons during the 1970s and 1980s. Many conducted joint task force missions in Latin America, Europe, and the Middle East.

In the late 1980s through 1990 the Army started inactivating its pathfinder units in the belief those skills could be learned by regular troops attending Air Assault School and by individuals within the unit who were pathfinder qualified. Operations during the Panama invasion and the Gulf War showed that Pathfinders were an important factor in successful airborne operations and the Army needed more of them. The 101st Airborne Division (Air Assault), which had retained a pathfinder unit during and after the Vietnam War, expanded its existing company and raised a second in 2005 by converting its long range surveillance detachment (LRSD) into another pathfinder company, giving each of its two aviation brigades a company. The 82nd Airborne Division followed suit by converted its LRSD to a pathfinder company under the 2d Battalion, 82nd Aviation Regiment. Additionally, the 10th Mountain Division (Light Infantry) at Fort Drum, New York, and the 25th Infantry Division in Hawaii have formed provisional pathfinder companies (e.g., they are not reflected in the units' tables of organization and equipment) and conduct combat operations in Iraq and Afghanistan. The pathfinder units today still live by the motto of "First In-Last Out" and wear the Pathfinder Torch.

The Army had five pathfinder companies in 2015. On May 15, the 101st Airborne Division inactivated its 159th Combat Aviation Brigade, including the brigade's pathfinder company. The 101st CAB was redesignated the CAB, 101st Airborne Division, bringing it in line with other non-numbered divisional CABs, and the division assumed the same organizational structure as the 10th Mountain Division, a light infantry unit.

In summer 2016, the provisional pathfinder company in the 25th Infantry Division was inactivated, followed by the inactivation on 2 August 2016 of the remaining pathfinder company in the 101st Airborne Division in a ceremony at Fort Campbell, and then the provisional company in the 10th Mountain Division by October 2016. The last pathfinder unit in the Army, a company authorized by MTOE in the 82d Airborne Division, was inactivated in a ceremony on 24 February 2017 at Simmons Army Airfield at Fort Bragg.

Training at the Pathfinder School continues, but there are no more pathfinder units.

Course prerequisites
All applicants must have passed a physical examination within five years, have a minimum profile of 111121, have no speech impediment, have passed the APFT within the last six months and meet the Army height and weight standards in accordance with AR 600-9.

Physicals for airborne qualified personnel must indicate "cleared to participate in airborne operations".

Applicants must have six months of service remaining on active duty upon completion of the course.

Officers: Active Army, reserve, or national guard officers (O–1 through O-3) assigned to a billet documented with the skill identifier "5Q" indicating a requirement to possess pathfinder skills in the most recent personnel management authorization document or updated authorization document. Attendance is restricted to officers in the following branches:
 Infantry
 Armor
 Engineers
 Military Intelligence
 Multifunctional Logistician

Enlisted: Active Army, reserve or national guard soldiers at the grades of E–3 through E–7, that have an Armed Services Vocational Aptitude Battery–General Technical score of 110 or above, and are from the following military occupational specialties can attend Pathfinder School:
 Infantryman
 Indirect Fire Infantryman
 Fire Support Specialist
 Air Traffic Control Operator
 Cavalry Scout
 Motor Transport Operator
 Parachute Rigger
 Unit Supply Specialist

Other services: Active and reserve U.S. Marine Corps officers in the grades of O–1 through O–3 and enlisted personnel in the grades of E–4 through E–7 in logistics and combat arms may attend. Active and reserve U.S. Air Force enlisted personnel serving as combat control team/forward air controllers in the grades of E–5 thought E–7 may attend.

Foreign students: Applicants must have a signed letter of intent, a waiver from HQDA, and U.S. government release for training. Units that sponsor foreign students must ensure they meet all course prerequisites prior to reporting for pathfinder training.

Pathfinder Course schedule

Week 1
Student receive pathfinder orientation.  Students begin learning sling load nomenclature, aircraft capabilities and sling load theory.  Pathfinder students identify nomenclature, air capabilities and deficiencies. A test of four different sling loads will be conducted where each Pathfinder student will clearly define each deficiency found.

Week 2
Students will be taught how to establish and operate HLZ/PZs.  Students will be taught to establish day/night DZs (CARP, GMRP, and VIRS) for the insertion of personnel and equipment.  Students will understand the 8 selection factors for selecting a drop zone and the duties and responsibilities of the drop zone support team leader (DZSTL).  Students will complete the Basic Airborne Refresher (if applicable) and will be taught how to perform the duties of the GTA during a VIRS drop.

Week 3
Students will gain technical competence on the static load/unload procedures for a UH-60 and will be able to perform the duties in every position of the sling load hook-up team.  Students will demonstrate the knowledge they have been taught during the course during the FTX, during which they are evaluated as a team leader/assistant team leader and ground to air/internal net recorder.  Students will demonstrate proficiency in all areas of pathfinder operations and meet all graduation requirements.

Graduation
Graduates from the US Army Pathfinder School are awarded the Pathfinder Badge.

Special recognition

Col. Robert L. Howard Award

The Col. Robert L. Howard Award is awarded to the Distinguished Honor Graduate of the Pathfinder class, with the highest overall grade point average with first-time "gos" in every event.

Instructor of the Cycle

The title of Instructor of the Cycle is awarded to the instructor whom the students and Instructors vote had the greatest positive impact throughout the course of training.

Personnel

Instructors

Instructors at the U.S. Army Pathfinder School are the famed and feared "Black Hats", named for the black baseball caps they wear as a part of their garrison uniform.  The Black Hat is a symbol of expertise, awarded to Airborne, Jumpmaster, and Pathfinder instructors who are certified to teach others how to conduct airborne operations.

Students
Pathfinders students are drawn primarily from the Army, but its sister services send students as well.  For all prospective students, an assignment in a billet requiring pathfinder skills is generally required. In the Army, prospective students would most likely be assigned to pathfinder units, like those found in the 101st, 10th Mountain, and 82nd Airborne divisions.  In the U.S. Navy, U.S. Air Force, and U.S. Marine Corps, prospective students would most likely be assigned to a unit conducting drop-zone operations, helicopter operations, or special operations units.

See also
U.S. Army Air Assault School
U.S. Army Airborne School
U.S. Army Jumpmaster School
U.S. Military Free-Fall School
U.S. Air Force Combat Control Team

References
FM 3-21.38 (Pathfinder Operations)
FM 3-21.220 (Static Line Parachuting Techniques and Training)
Basic Airborne Companies Standard Operating Procedures (BACSOP)
HHC, 1st Battalion (Airborne), 507th Infantry Regiment SOP (HHCSOP), dated October 2011

External links
Fort Campbell Pathfinder School Official Website
Army National Guard Pathfinder School Official Website
Warrior Training Center Official Website
U.S. Army Official Homepage
Lineage & Honors for the 1st Battalion (Airborne), 507th Infantry Regiment
Unit Insignia and Coat of Arms of the 507th Infantry Regiment
Beret Flash of the 1st Battalion, 507th Infantry Regiment

Parachuting in the United States
Military supporting service occupations
Airborne units and formations of the United States Army